The 2016 Philippine House of Representatives elections were the 34th lower house elections in the Philippines. They were held on May 9, 2016 to elect members to the House of Representatives of the Philippines. The winning candidates were to comprise the House's contingent in the 17th Congress of the Philippines that would serve from June 30, 2016 to June 30, 2019.

The House of Representatives elections were part of the 2016 general election where elections for President, Vice President, Senators, and all local officials, including those from the Autonomous Region in Muslim Mindanao, were also held.

The Philippines uses parallel voting in its lower house elections. There are 297 seats in the House; 238 of these are district representatives, and 59 are party-list representatives. The law mandates that there should be one party-list representative for every four district representatives. District representatives are elected under the plurality voting system from single-member districts. Party-list representatives are elected via the nationwide vote with a 2% "soft" election threshold, with a 3-seat cap. The party in the party-list election with the most votes usually wins three seats, the other parties with more than 2% of the vote two seats, and the parties with less than 2% of the vote winning a seat each if the 20% quota is not met.

Electoral system
The election for seats in the House of Representatives is done via parallel voting. A voter has two votes: one for one's local district, and another via the party-list system. A candidate is not allowed to stand for both ballots, and parties participating in the district elections would have to ask for permission on the Commission on Elections, with major parties not allowed to participate, in the party-list election.

Election via the districts

Each district sends one representative to the House of Representatives, with the winner having the highest number of votes winning that district's seat. The representatives from the districts comprise at most 80% of the seats.

Election via the party-list system

In the party-list system, the parties contesting the election represent a sector, or several sectors, or an ethnic group. In determining the winners, the entire country is treated as one "district". Each party that surpasses the 2% election threshold automatically wins one seat, they can win an additional number of seats in proportion to the number of votes they received, but they can't have more than three seats. The representatives elected via the party-list system, also known as "sectoral representatives" should comprise at least 20% of the seats. However, since the winners from the parties that surpass the 2% threshold had not reached the 20% quota ever since the party-list system was instituted, the parties that received less than 2% of the first preference vote are given one seat each until the 20% quota has been filled up.

Campaigning
The parties contesting the district elections campaign at the district level; there is no national-level campaigning. While no party has been able to win a majority of seats in the House of Representatives since the 1987 elections, the party of the incumbent president had usually controlled the chamber in the phenomenon known locally as the "Padrino System" or patronage politics, with other parties aligning themselves with the president's policies in exchange for pork barrel and future political favors.

Usually, a gubernatorial candidate has a slate of candidates for vice governor, board members and representative. Gubernatorial candidates, aside from supporting a slate of national politicians, may also have slates in the individual cities or towns for mayors, vice mayors and councilors. These slates are usually under one party, but multi-party alliances are not uncommon.

Redistricting
Reapportioning (redistricting) the number of seats is either via national reapportionment after the release of every census, or via piecemeal redistricting for every province or city. National reapportionment has not happened since the 1987 constitution took effect, and aside from piecemeal redistricting, the apportionment was based on the ordinance from the constitution, which was in turn based from the 1980 census.

These are currently 5 new districts that shall be contested in 2016:
Davao Occidental
No seat was added as the part of the old 2nd district of Davao del Sur shall be absorbed by its lone district, while the remainder became the province of Davao Occidental
Biñan, alternatively the fifth district of Laguna
Legislative districts of Batangas
Batangas City district designated as its fifth district
Lipa district designated as its sixth district
Cebu–7th

These are House (HB) and Senate (SB) Bills that pertains to redistricting:

Retiring and term limited incumbents

There are 69 open seats in the House from incumbents that are term-limited and were not running.

Results

President Benigno Aquino III's Liberal Party emerged with the party having the plurality of seats in the House of Representatives, winning more than a hundred seats. Meanwhile, in the presidential election, Davao City mayor Rodrigo Duterte of Partido Demokratiko Pilipino-Lakas ng Bayan (PDP–Laban) emerged with an insurmountable lead over the Liberals' Mar Roxas.

Meanwhile, the Nationalist People's Coalition finished second in number of seats won, followed by the Nacionalista Party, National Unity Party, United Nationalist Alliance, Lakas–CMD, PDP–Laban, Laban ng Demokratikong Pilipino and Aksyon Demokratiko. Several local parties also won seats, along with a handful of independents.

While PDP–Laban just won three seats, several members of the Liberal Party immediately abandoned that party in favor of PDP–Laban. PDP–Laban also signed coalition agreements with all major parties, including the Liberal Party, ensuring that they would have the numbers once the 17th Congress of the Philippines opens in late July.

Congressional districts results

Detailed results 

Notes

Party-list result

The winning party-lists were proclaimed on May 19. The commission proclaimed 46 party-lists, with Ako Bicol winning the maximum three seats, while parties with at least 2% of the vote being guaranteed at least 1 seat. Eleven parties won 2 seats each, while 34 others won one seat each.

Ako Bicol won three seats for the second time in history, after achieving the same feat in 2010. Bayan Muna, on the other hand, failed to win at least 2 seats for the first time, after winning the maximum three seats in 2001, 2004 and 2007.

Summary

Defeated incumbents

District representatives

Party-list representatives
Alliance of Volunteer Educators
Eulogio Magsaysay
Ang Nars
Leah Paquiz
Append
Pablo Nava III

Aftermath
After proclamations were held for district representatives, three people were seen to have a chance in becoming speaker. These include PDP–Laban's Pantaleon Alvarez of Davao del Norte, National Unity Party (NUP)'s Karlo Nograles of Davao City, and incumbent speaker Feliciano Belmonte, Jr. of Quezon City.

Duterte chose PDP–Laban's Alvarez, a returning congressman, over Nograles as his preferred candidate for the speakership. Nograles gave way to Alvarez, to secure a "super majority" in Congress, while keeping the minority bloc to about 20 members.

Alvarez and defeated senatorial candidate Ferdinand Martin Romualdez, chairman of the Lakas–CMD, signed an agreement formalizing their parties' alliance. The Nacionalista Party (NP) also joined the alliance with the PDP–Laban; Duterte's running mate, Senator Alan Peter Cayetano, although ran as an independent, is a member of the Nacionalista Party. The Nationalist People's Coalition (NPC) have also contacted Alvarez about the speakership election, while Alvarez described a coalition with the NUP as a "done deal".

The incumbent speaker, the Liberals' Feliciano Belmonte, Jr. of Quezon City expects the support of at least 120 members of the Liberal Party and allies from other parties. Meanwhile, Alvarez hosted a luncheon at the Midas Hotel and Casino on May 18 where 59 representatives attended. Alvarez said that his "Coalition for Change" includes representatives from the PDP–Laban, the NP, NPC, NUP, Lakas, various party-lists, and even from the Liberal Party.

Days after the Alvarez luncheon, Belmonte conceded the speakership race, saying that Alvarez had the numbers. Alvarez visited Belmonte's home in Quezon City to pave way for a smooth transition of power in the lower house. This was after the NPC affirmed its support for PDP–Laban. Meanwhile, outgoing Majority Leader Neptali Gonzales II said that there are some Liberal representatives who won't jump ship to PDP–Laban, but would still vote for Alvarez for the speakership, with the Liberals signing the same coalition agreement with the NPC, which the latter also signed with PDP–Laban.

Danilo Suarez of Quezon, who ran under the United Nationalist Alliance (UNA) emerged as Belmonte's primary opponent for the minority leader position. Suarez says he has the support of some 17 lawmakers from UNA, Lakas–CMD, and party-list representatives allied with the former. While this is happening, the NUP and Lakas announced a coalition that would support Duterte in the lower house, and backed the election of Alvarez for the speakership.

Alvarez spent the remainder of May consolidating the pro-Duterte forces in the House of Representatives. Belmonte seemed content to lead the opposition in the lower house, rather than joining the majority bloc, saying that "we must have a minority. That's needed." At least 23 representatives abandoned the Liberal Party for PDP–Laban. Meanwhile, the NUP signed a coalition agreement with PDP–Laban, joining the Coalition for Change.

References

House of Representatives
2016